Ceragenia is a genus of beetles in the family Cerambycidae, containing the following species:

 Ceragenia aurulenta Monné & Martins, 1991
 Ceragenia bicornis (Fabricius, 1801)
 Ceragenia insulana Fisher, 1943
 Ceragenia leprieurii Buquet in Guérin-Méneville, 1844

References

Trachyderini
Cerambycidae genera